The Massachusetts Arms Company, of Chicopee Falls, Massachusetts was a manufacturer of firearms and firearm-related products from about 1849 into the early 20th century.

The Massachusetts Arms Company was incorporated March 5, 1850 and was founded by Joshua Stevens along with Horace Smith and Daniel Wesson, who later founded Smith & Wesson. It was an outgrowth of the Wesson Rifle Company.

Christian Sharps, who later founded the Sharps Rifle Company, transferred the manufacture of his first rifle to the company in 1849 or 1850.

The company also manufactured Wesson & Leavitt revolvers between 1850 and 1851. These were said to be the first revolvers patented after Colt's.

In 1851, Samuel Colt filed and won a historic patent infringement lawsuit against the Massachusetts Arms Company. The company then limited its revolver production to relatively unpopular designs by Edward Maynard until 1857, when Colt's patent expired.

Maynard patented his revolutionary breechloading rifle in 1851. It was actually manufactured by Massachusetts Arms, which had been using Maynard's system under contract for several years. In 1855 they produced 2,000 Greene Carbines, a Maynard system firearm, for a British government contract. These carbines were NOT used in the Crimean War.

Maynard's rifle was operated by a lever which when depressed raised the barrel to open the breech for loading. A brass cartridge, also developed by Maynard, was then inserted and the lever raised to close the breech. Once cocked the loaded rifle could then be primed by either placing a percussion cap directly on its nipple or by using Maynard's patented priming system to advance a primer to the nipple.

Also in 1857 the company received a contract to manufacture Adams revolvers under license for the U.S. government. Some 500 or so were produced and used in the U.S. Civil War.

The company also produced single- and double-barrel shotguns, including both box-locks and external central hammers.  Later it manufactured a selection of 20- and 28-bore Maynard-action shotguns of 1865 and 1873 patterns.

With civil war looming some Southern states purchased Maynard rifles from the company for their state militias. Of close to 3000 sales, most were to Florida, Georgia, and Mississippi. The First Model Maynard was designated an official Confederate firearm.

The factory burned down in January 1861, halting production until the factory was rebuilt in 1863. The company then received an order for 20,000 of the simpler Second Model Maynard carbines. Deliveries of these guns began in June 1864 continuing through May 1865. As the war was then coming to an end few saw service. Some, however, are known to have been used by the 9th and 11th Indiana Cavalry and the 11th Tennessee Cavalry regiments.

In 1893 the company was purchased by the J Stevens Arms & Tool Company, also founded by Joshua Stevens.  Stevens had left the Massachusetts Arms Company in 1864.  The purchase was made to protect the interests of Edward Maynard's widow and provide security for the company's workers.

In the late 19th century the company began producing revolvers on various Smith & Wesson patterns.

Production continued until the factory closed permanently during the Great Depression.

The Massachusetts Arms Company name was retained by Stevens and later used as a trade name for firearms produced for sale at the Blish, Mize and Silliman Hardware Company of Atchison, Kansas.

References 

Firearm manufacturers of the United States
Massachusetts in the American Civil War
American Civil War weapons
Privately held companies based in Massachusetts
Companies based in Hampden County, Massachusetts
Manufacturing companies based in Massachusetts
Stevens Arms